Laccocenus is a genus of beetles in the family Carabidae, containing the following species:

 Laccocenus ambiguus Sloane, 1890
 Laccocenus vicinus Moore, 2004

References

Psydrinae